Melaleuca viridiflora, commonly known as broad-leaved paperbark, is a plant in the myrtle family Myrtaceae, and is native to woodlands, swamps and streams in monsoonal areas of northern Australia and New Guinea. It is usually a small tree with an open canopy, papery bark and spikes of cream, yellow, green or red flowers.

Description

The flowers are cream, yellow, yellow-green or occasionally red and arranged in spikes on the ends of branch which continue to grow after flowering and sometimes also in the upper leaf axils. There are five bundles of stamens around the flower, each with 6 or 9 stamens although the stamens are only weakly joined in bundles. Flowering can occur at any time of the year but most commonly happens in winter.

Taxonomy and naming
Melaleuca viridiflora was first formally described in 1788 by Daniel Solander, the description published by Joseph Gaertner in De fructibus et seminibus plantarum including a carefully drawn figure of the stamen bundle and fruiting capsules. The description was made during the forced stay of the Endeavour on the banks of the Endeavour River, at the site of the present-day Cooktown, during the first voyage of James Cook. The specific epithet (viridiflora) means "green-flowered", referring to the most common flower colour of this species.

Distribution and habitat
This melaleuca occurs in tropical areas of Australia, including as far south as Maryborough in Queensland, northern parts of Western Australia south to the Dampier Peninsula district, and the northern half of the Northern Territory. It is also found in the southern part of West Papua in Indonesia and southern Papua New Guinea. It grows on the margins of gallery forest, in forest, woodland and swampy plains in a variety of soils.

Ecology
Melaleuca viridiflora forests provide habitat for orchid species including the rare, threatened or endangered Calochilus psednus, Pachystoma pubescens, Eulophia bicallosa and Cardwell midge orchid (Genoplesium tectum). Individual trees often host the epiphytic ant-house plant, (Myrmecodia beccarii).

Plants distributed in south-eastern Florida in 1900 under the name Melaleuca viridiflora have been subsequently identified as Melaleuca quinquenervia.

Uses

Traditional uses
Melaleuca viridiflora is used by Aboriginal Australians for multiple uses. The bark is peeled off in layers and is used for shelter, bedding, containers, storing and cooking food, fire tinder, watercraft, fish traps and wrapping corpses. In traditional medicine, an infusion from leaves was drunk, inhaled or used for bathing to treat coughs, colds, congestion, headache, fever and influenza.

Essential oils
Different populations of this species yield different oils but there are two distinct groups. One is rich in terpenic oil but otherwise highly variable with three distinct chemotypes. Another population is rich in methyl cinnamate with two chemotypes.

Horticulture
Melaleuca viridiflora is a useful and adaptable small tree in cultivation, with the red-flowered form being preferred. It is suitable for tropical and subtropical areas where there is high summer rainfall, especially in heavy clay soils. Its open canopy makes it a useful host tree for epiphytes such as 
Dendrobium.

Gallery

References

Bushfood
Flora of Queensland
Medicinal plants
viridiflora
Myrtales of Australia
Flora of New Guinea
Flora of the Northern Territory
Plants described in 1788
Rosids of Western Australia